Cedric R. Hunter (born January 16, 1965) is an American former professional basketball player. Born in Omaha, Nebraska, he was a 6'0" (183 cm) 180 lb (82 kg) point guard and played collegiately at the University of Kansas.

Hunter was signed as a free agent by the NBA's Charlotte Hornets to a 10-day contract on February 14, 1992, and played one minute of one game with them in 1991–92, registering no statistics.

Hunter played for the Topeka Sizzlers, Omaha Racers, and the Sioux Falls Skyforce in the Continental Basketball Association. Hunter is one of the CBA's All-Time leaders in games played and assists.

After his basketball career ended, Hunter continued to reside in Omaha with his family. As of 2022, he works as a behavioral counselor at Boys Town Day School.

Hunter is a member of the University of Kansas Basketball Hall of Fame as a player on the 1986 Final Four Team.

References

External links
NBA stats @ basketballreference.com
CBA statistics at statscrew.com

1965 births
Living people
African-American basketball players
American expatriate basketball people in Canada
American men's basketball players
Basketball players from Nebraska
Charlotte Hornets players
Kansas Jayhawks men's basketball players
Omaha Racers players
Point guards
San Diego Wildcards players
Santa Barbara Islanders players
Sioux Falls Skyforce (CBA) players
Sportspeople from Omaha, Nebraska
Topeka Sizzlers players
Undrafted National Basketball Association players
21st-century African-American people
20th-century African-American sportspeople